Piddington is an English surname, originally given to people from Piddington, Northamptonshire, or Piddington, Oxfordshire. Notable people with the surname include:

 Albert Piddington (1862–1945), Australian High Court Justice
 Andrew Piddington (born 1949), English film director
 Henry Piddington (1797–1858), British-Indian scientist
 Jack Piddington John Hobart "Jack" Piddington (1910–1997), Australian research scientist
 Marion Louisa Piddington, (1869–1950) Australian activist in sex education and eugenics
 Phyllis Piddington (1910–2001), Australian novelist, poet and short story writer
 Ralph Piddington (1906–1974), New Zealand psychologist, anthropologist and university professor
 William Henry Piddington (1856–1900). Australian politician 
 William Piddington (1815–1887), Australian bookseller and politician
 William Piddington, better known as Bill Tarmey (1941-2012), English actor 
 The Piddingtons, Sydney Piddington (1918–1991) and Lesley Piddington (1925–2016) Australian husband and wife performers of mentalism

References